The 2004 FIFA U-19 Women's World Championship was held from 10 to 27 November 2004.  It was the second edition of the youth tournament for women put together by FIFA, before being renamed FIFA U-20 Women's World Championship for the 2006 edition.  The tournament was hosted by Thailand, in two stadiums in Bangkok, one in Chiang Mai and another in Phuket. This was the first FIFA women's tournament held in Southeast Asia.

Brazil's Marta was the Adidas Golden Ball recipient, as the tournament's most valuable player (MVP), and Canada's Brittany Timko won the Golden Shoe with 7 goals in 4 games.

Venues

Qualified teams

The places have been allocated as follows to confederations: CAF (1), AFC (2), UEFA (4), CONCACAF (2), CONMEBOL (1), OFC (1), plus the host country (1).

1.Teams that made their debut.

Squads

Group stage
All times local (UTC+7)

Group A

Group B

Group C

Knockout Round 
All times local (UTC+7)

Knockout Map

Quarterfinals

Semifinals

Third place play-off

Final

Awards

The following awards were given for the tournament:

All star team

Goalscorers
7 goals
  Brittany Timko

6 goals
  Anja Mittag

3 goals

  Collette McCallum
  Cristiane
  Marta
  Lou Xiaoxu
  Zhang Ying
  Celia Okoyino Da Mbabi
  Megan Rapinoe
  Jessica Rostedt
  Angie Woznuk

2 goals

  Sandra
  Veronique Maranda
  Melanie Behringer
  Lena Goeßling
  Patricia Hanebeck
  Simone Laudehr
  Agnese Ricco
  Akudo Sabi
  Ekaterina Sochneva
  Jade Boho
  Amy Rodriguez

1 goal

  Selin Kuralay
  Kylie Ledbrook
  Kelly
  Tanya Dennis
  Aysha Jamani
  Kara Lang
  Jodi-Ann Robinson
  Liu Sa
  Wang Kun
  Xu Yuan
  Anna Blässe
  Annike Krahn
  Raffaella Manieri
  Stella Godwin
  Nkese Udoh
  Cynthia Uwak
  Olga Petrova
  Elena Terekhova
  Svetlana Tsidikova
  Ksenia Tsybutovich
  Lee Jang-mi
  Park Eun-Sun
  Park Hee-young
  Nuria Zufia
  Kerri Hanks
  Sheree Gray

Own goals
  Annike Krahn (1) (for United States)
  Fabiana Costi (1) (for Brazil)
  Zurine Gil Garcia (1) (for Russia)
  Thidarat Wiwasukhu (1) (for Australia)

References

External links
FIFA U-19 Women's World Championship Thailand 2004, FIFA.com
FIFA Technical Report

FIFA
FIFA
FIFA U-20 Women's World Cup tournaments
International association football competitions hosted by Thailand
November 2004 sports events in Asia
2004 in youth association football